Laja may refer to:

 Bolivia
Laja Municipality, a subdivision of La Paz Department
Laja, Bolivia, a town in the municipality

 Chile
Laja, Chile, a town in Bío-Bío Province
Laja Lake
Laja Falls
Isla del Laja

Panama
La Laja, a corregimiento in Las Tablas District, Los Santos Province, Panama 

 Syria
Lajat, also spelled Laja, a geographic region

See also
Laja River (disambiguation)